Chen Danqing (born 11 August 1953, Shanghai, China) is a Chinese-American artist, writer, and art critic. He is well known for his realist paintings of Tibetans. Chen graduated from China Central Academy of Fine Arts.

Life 

Chen Danqing's family home is Taishan, Guangdong province. He started learning oil painting in secondary school, and acquainted himself with young artists like Chen Yifei and Xia Baoyuan.  Because his grandfather moved to Taiwan with the Nationalist government, he also had citizenship in the Republic of China. He moved to the United States in the 1982 and became a citizen there.

Time in China
In the 1970s, after he graduated from his secondary school at the age of 16 and was forced to go to the countryside of southern Ganzhou. Later, with the help of Chen Yifei, he moved to the suburbs of Nanjing and settled down there. During this period, his completed works include "Writing a Letter to Chairman Mao" (a painting that expresses the aspiration of youths to stay in rural area), "Tears Flooding the Autumnal Fields
", and a number of oil paintings and Lianhuanhua works on the topic of Chinese Civil War. Well known within the artistic community, his sketches were imitated by his peers and later scholars.

With the restoration of the National Higher Education Entrance Examination in 1978 after the ending of the Cultural Revolution, Chen Danqing was admitted to the oil paintings department of China Central Academy of Fine Arts as a graduate student. He stayed and taught at the school after his graduation in 1980. In the same year, his thesis work, "Tibetan Paintings", received much wider recognition than any of his previous works, making Chen a noteworthy Chinese artist.

Moving to the United States
In 1982, Chen moved to New York City, United States, to be a professional painter. In the early 1980s, Chen painted in the Socialist Realist style and was at one stage described by the government as the most talented oil painter in China. Beginning with his series of paintings about Tibetans in the mid-1980s, Chen began to lose official support for his work. Chen was represented exclusively by Wally Findlay Galleries in New York, Palm Beach, Beverly Hills and Paris. Influenced by French Realist Jean-François Millet, his Tibetans series had a tremendous influence on the emerging Native Soil Painting movement. This new work departed from the size of his earlier Socialist Realist painting in favor of the intimate style and scale of the nineteenth-century French naturalists. He portrayed the Tibetans in a dignified, forthright way, avoiding the patronizing depictions of ethnic minorities common at the time. Chen's later work retained the sharp, realistic qualities of the Tibetan series, and has often focused on portrayals of young women.

Returning to China
Chen returned to China in 2000 as a professor at Tsinghua University Academy of Fine Arts and doctoral supervisor.

In October 2004, because of dissatisfaction with enrollment system, he resigned from Tsinghua Academy.

Chen has published essays "New York Suo ji (2000)", "Chen Music Notes (2002)", "The Extra Material (2003)", "Step Backwards Set (2004), "Collection of Serial on the Back (2007), "Waste Collection (2009)" on education and urban problems.
Chen participated in the 2008 Beijing Olympic Games opening ceremony with planning, design, and creating prose written in the book of zhang.

Description of artwork 
Chen is well known for his Realist paintings and garnered critical acclaim for his portraits of Tibetans. His earliest artwork from the 1970s included sketches, and Chen learned oil painting in secondary school. In 1976, he traveled to Tibet, the place where has a significant influence to his future art developments. The trip to Tibet inspired him to make a number of paintings about the ethnic minorities of the nation ('Tibetans paintings/series').

Tibetan paintings
In 1978, Chen Danqing was admitted to the Central Academy of Painting graduate classes. In 1980, he created a stack of seven paintings and sketches as a graduation creation in Tibet. These paintings are: Mother and Child, Pilgrimage, One City, Shepherd, City of the Two, Shampoo, and Kamba Man. Later convention to collectively as "Tibetan paintings."

The "Tibetan paintings," caused a great shock in the art community. The "Tibetan paintings" continue to get attention, commentary, research, and renowned at home and abroad.

"Tibetan paintings," are recognized as China realist paintings, distinct from the former Soviet influence. Meanwhile, the "Tibetan paintings" focus on the vision side, non-heroic, non-themed real life.

Still Life

In 1995, Chen completed a set of 15 meters long and two meters high ten-linked painting Still Life, a contemporary installation art.

Chen Danqing returned to China in 2000 and took his students to go to the Beijing Road Village painting farmers, veterans, to underground mine workers. He always insisted on painting in a realistic style.

2010, Yang Feiyun and Chen Danqing planned two major art exhibitions - "Back to the Sketch," and "In the Face of the Original Code".

Artwork

Group exhibition
· Army Art Exhibition ("march into Tibet," China Art Museum, Beijing 1977)
· National Art Exhibition ("Tears shaman harvest field" China Art Museum, Beijing 1977)
· Central Academy of Fine Arts Graduate Exhibition ("Tibet group painting" CAFA Art Museum, Beijing 1980)
· People's Republic of China Art Exhibition (Spring Salon in Paris, France 1982)
· Chinese Contemporary Art Exhibition (Wally Findlay Galleries, New York, USA · 1982)
· Group Show (Santa Ana Los Angeles Museum of Contemporary Art · USA 1987)
· China Five Thousand Years of Civilization Art Exhibition (Columbia Guggenheim Museum of Modern Art in New York · 1998)
· Twentieth Century Neoclassical Retrospective (Museum of Modern Art · Belgium Wusi Deng 2001)
· China Dialogue Exhibition of Contemporary German Art (Du Du Fort Museum of Modern Art · Germany Myers 2002)
· The Original Image II · Contemporary Works on Paper Exhibition (Yibo Gallery, Shanghai 2003)
· Art and War (Graz, Graz, Austria, 2003 Art Museum)
· Feel · Memory (Yibo Gallery, Shanghai 2004)
· Century Spirit · Chinese Contemporary Art Masters (Millennium Art Museum, Beijing 2004)
· Art and China's Revolution (Asia Society, New York, 2008 Art Museum)
· Doran 5 years · Chinese Contemporary Art Retrospective (Shanghai Duolun Museum of Modern Art · 2008)
· Very status · Chinese Contemporary Art Exhibition of Twelve Masters (Wall Art Museum, Beijing 2009)
· Chinese Painting Exhibition of artists of the twentieth century (China National Grand Theater, Beijing 2009)
· Original Song 2011 Summer Exhibition (original song Gallery, Shanghai 2011)
· Khe Qingyuan · Chinese New Painting (Louise Blouin Foundation · London 2010)
· Thirty Years of Chinese Contemporary Art History · Painting articles (Minsheng Art Museum · Shanghai 2010)
· Transformation of Chinese History, Art 2000-2009 (National Convention Center, Beijing 2010)
· Spirit and History (National Exhibition Tour 2010)
· 2010 Offshore Oil Painting · Sculpture Exhibition of Famous (Museum of Contemporary Art · Shanghai Zhangjiang 2010)
· Track and Qualitative · Beijing Film Academy 60th Anniversary Exhibition (Space Art Gallery, Beijing 2010)
· Youth · Youth Narrative Painting Exhibition (Shanghai Art Museum Shanghai 2010)
· Love and Hope - Support Japan affected children (Iberia Center for Contemporary Art, Beijing 2011)
· Visual Memory (Shanghai Art Museum Shanghai 2012)
· Four Decades of Stories · Time Friendship Art (Shanghai, Nanchang 2012)
· Integrate the New Extension - Returned Overseas Artists Painting Exhibition (Beijing World Art Museum, Beijing 2012)
· Group Jane Meta · National Ten Art Museum Exhibition (China Art Museum, Beijing 2013)
· The 55th Venice Biennale · Parallel Exhibition "Heart Beat" (Venice, Italy · 2013)

Solo exhibition
· Chen Danqing Exhibition  My Paintings and Tibet (Wally Findlay Galleries, New York · United States)
· Chen Danqing Exhibition (Wally Findlay Galleries, Beverly Hills · USA)
· Chen Danqing Oil Painting Exhibition (Sun Yat-sen Memorial Hall in Taipei · 1995)
· Chen Danqing Exhibition (Hong Kong University of Science and Technology, Hong Kong Arts Centre · 1998)
· Chen Danqing 1968-1999 Sketch Painting Exhibition (Beijing, Guangzhou, Wuhan, Shenyang, Nanjing Shanghai 2000)
· Chen Danqing Print Exhibition (Miki International Art, Beijing 2010)
· Chen Danqing Returned Years (Chinese Painting Academy, Beijing 2010)

Curatorial
· Back to Painting (Museum of China, Beijing)
· In the Face of the Original Code (Chinese Painting Academy, Beijing)
· Shanghai Notepad · 1960 Photo Exhibition (Today Art Museum, Beijing)
· Tracer One Hundred Bridge Picture Show (Suzhou Museum Suzhou)

Collections
· Military Museum of the Chinese Revolution
· Jiangsu Provincial Art Museum
· China Art Gallery
· Central Academy of Fine Arts
· Harvard University
· Wally Findlay Galleries International, Inc.
· Europe, the Americas, Asia dozens of agencies, collectors

Paintings
 Traditional Chinese Studies Institute (2001)
· Chen Danqing Sketch
· Chen Danqing Sketch Collection (Tianjin People's Fine Arts Publishing House)
· Chen Danqing Paintings (Chinese University of Hong Kong)
· Chen Danqing Album · Still Life (Hong Kong University of Science and Arts Centre)
· Chen Danqing Sketch Collection (Guangxi Fine Arts Publishing House)
· Chen Danqing 1968-1999 Sketch Painting Collection (Hebei Education Press)
· Chen Danqing Contemporary Artists Series (Sichuan Fine Arts Publishing House)
· Chen Danqing Returned a Decade Painting Sketch (Guangxi Normal University Press)
· Chen Danqing Sketch Painting (Zhejiang People's Fine Arts Publishing House)

References

1953 births
Living people
Chinese art critics
Chinese painters
Central Academy of Fine Arts alumni
Art Students League of New York alumni
Academic staff of Tsinghua University
Ganzhou
Painters from Shanghai
Writers from Shanghai
American people of Chinese descent